Wu Yongchun (born 30 March 1989 in Yanji, Yanbian) is a Chinese footballer of Korean descent.

Club career
Wu Yongchun started his professional football career in 2007 when he was promoted to second tier football club Yanbian FC's first team squad. He would gradually establish himself as a regular within their team and was a vital part of the team that won the 2015 China League One division. On 5 March 2016, Wu made his Super League debut in the first match of 2016 season against Shanghai Shenhua in a game that ended in a 1-1 draw.

Career statistics
Statistics accurate as of match played 31 December 2020.

Honours

Club
Yanbian FC
 China League One: 2015

References

External links
 

1989 births
Living people
Chinese footballers
People from Yanbian
Yanbian Funde F.C. players
Chinese Super League players
China League One players
Chinese people of Korean descent
Association football defenders